Filip Kasalica (born 17 December 1988) is a Serbian footballer who plays for OFK Beograd. Although he most frequently plays as striker, he can be deployed in any position in the attack.

Early life
Being the son of a former footballer, Kasalica was born in Titovo Užice, SR Serbia, SFR Yugoslavia. His father, Davor Kasalica, had played for the local team, FK Sloboda Užice.

Club career

Early career
Filip started playing in OFK Beograd in 2004. After minor spells with Jedinstvo Paraćin, Mačva Šabac and Srem, he returned to the top flight by joining Hajduk Kula in 2008. In the first half of the 2011/12 season, Kasalica represented FK Sloboda Užice scoring a total of 7 goals in 14 appearances with 2 assists in the Serbian SuperLiga. He also made an appearance in the Serbian Cup in which se scored a goal. Due to these performances, the two biggest Serbian clubs, FK Partizan and Red Star Belgrade showed interest to sign Kasalica.

Red Star Belgrade
In December 2011, Kasalica joined Red Star Belgrade from Sloboda for a transfer fee of approximately €220,000. Filip made his debut for Red Star on 14 March 2012 in a match against Smederevo. He came in as a substitute in the 75th minute of the game. After only one minute and thirteen seconds, he managed to score his first goal for the club. This made him the player that scored the fastest goals in his debut in the history of Red Star, beating the 50-year-old previous record of three minutes and 42 seconds held by Bora Kostić. Only a week later on 21 March 2012, he scored a goal against Red Star's arch-rivals Partizan in the Eternal derby after coming on from the bench in the second half.

Ulsan Hyundai
On 9 July 2014, Kasalica joined Ulsan Hyundai from Red Star Belgrade.

Ordabasy
In January 2016, Kasalica moved to the Kazakhstan Premier League with FC Ordabasy.

International career
Despite being born in Serbia, Kasalica accepted an invitation from coach Branko Brnović to represent the Montenegrin U-21 national team. He made his debut for the national team on 15 August 2012, during which he scored a goal against Latvia in the 76th minute. He has earned a total of 11 caps, scoring 1 goal. His final international was a March 2014 friendly match against Ghana.

Career statistics

International goals
Scores and results list Montenegro's goal tally first.

Honours
Red Star
Serbian SuperLiga (1): 2013–14
Serbian Cup (1): 2011–12

References

External links

Filip Kasalica Stats at Utakmica.rs
 

1988 births
Living people
Sportspeople from Užice
Serbian people of Montenegrin descent
Association football forwards
Serbia and Montenegro footballers
Montenegrin footballers
Montenegro under-21 international footballers
Montenegro international footballers
OFK Beograd players
FK Mačva Šabac players
FK Srem players
FK Hajduk Kula players
FK Sloboda Užice players
Red Star Belgrade footballers
Ulsan Hyundai FC players
NK Istra 1961 players
FC Ordabasy players
FK Napredak Kruševac players
Platanias F.C. players
FK Rad players
FK Radnički Niš players
Serbian SuperLiga players
Serbian First League players
K League 1 players
Croatian Football League players
Kazakhstan Premier League players
Super League Greece players
Montenegrin expatriate footballers
Expatriate footballers in South Korea
Montenegrin expatriate sportspeople in South Korea
Expatriate footballers in Croatia
Montenegrin expatriate sportspeople in Croatia
Expatriate footballers in Kazakhstan
Montenegrin expatriate sportspeople in Kazakhstan
Expatriate footballers in Greece
Montenegrin expatriate sportspeople in Greece